Emmet Charles McHardy (27 June 1904 – 17 May 1933) was a New Zealand Catholic missionary. He was born in Pihama, Taranaki, New Zealand, on 27 June 1904. He served as a missionary in the North Solomon Islands on the island of Bougainville.

References

1904 births
1933 deaths
New Zealand Roman Catholic missionaries
Roman Catholic missionaries in Papua New Guinea
People from Taranaki